Thuringowa State High School is a high school located in Australia and specifically situated in the City of Townsville, North Queensland in the suburb of Condon.

Thuringowa High opened in 1987 with year 8, 9 and 11 students, and offers programs in sport, cultural achievement, the Theatre Restaurant (Thuringowa high school was State finalist in the inaugural Showcase Awards) and Vocational education, amongst others.

Thuringowa High serves students from years 7 to 12, most of its students are from the neighbouring suburbs of Condon, Rasmussen, Kelso and Kirwan.

See also
List of schools in Queensland
City of Thuringowa

References

External links
Thuringowa State High School Website

Public high schools in Queensland
Educational institutions established in 1987
Schools in Townsville
1987 establishments in Australia